Emilio Cruz Díaz (born 27 November 1936) is a Spanish former racing cyclist. He rode in the 1963 Tour de France as well as four editions of the Vuelta a España.

Major results

1955
 2nd Prueba Villafranca de Ordizia
1957
 1st Klasika Primavera
1958
 1st GP Torrelavega
1960
 3rd Overall Volta a Catalunya
1st Stage 3 (TTT)
 5th Overall Euskal Bizikleta
1961
 1st Stage 2 Volta a Catalunya
 7th Overall Tour de l'Avenir
1st Stage 3
 8th Campeonato Vasco Navarro de Montaña
1962
 1st Circuito Montañés
 3rd GP Villafranca de Ordizia
1963
 5th Overall Vuelta a la Comunidad Valenciana

References

External links
 

1936 births
Living people
Spanish male cyclists
People from Torrelavega
Cyclists from Cantabria